The 2010–11 Radford Highlanders men's basketball team represented Radford University in the 2010–11 NCAA Division I men's basketball season. The team plays in the Big South Conference (BSC) and was led by head coach Brad Greenberg in his fourth year.

References

Radford Highlanders men's basketball seasons
Radford
Radford Highlanders men's basketball
Radford Highlanders men's basketball